Orbea ciliata, called the starfish stapelia, is a species of flowering plant in the family Apocynaceae, native to the Cape Provinces of South Africa. A succulent, it has gained the Royal Horticultural Society's Award of Garden Merit.

References

Asclepiadoideae
Flora of the Cape Provinces
Endemic flora of South Africa
Succulent plants
Plants described in 1975